Vilma Egresi (May 7, 1936 - January 7, 1979) is a Hungarian sprint canoer who competed from the mid-1950s to the early 1960s. She won a bronze medal in the K-2 500 m event at the 1960 Summer Olympics in Rome.

Egresi also won a silver medal in the K-2 500 m event at the 1954 ICF Canoe Sprint World Championships in Mâcon.

References

Sports-reference.com profile

1936 births
1979 deaths
Canoeists at the 1960 Summer Olympics
Hungarian female canoeists
Olympic canoeists of Hungary
Olympic bronze medalists for Hungary
Olympic medalists in canoeing
ICF Canoe Sprint World Championships medalists in kayak
Medalists at the 1960 Summer Olympics